A blister hangar is a novel arched, portable aircraft hangar designed by notable British airport architect Graham R Dawbarn patented by Miskins and Sons in 1939.  Originally made of wooden ribs clad with profiled steel sheets, steel lattice ribs and corrugated steel sheet cladding later became the norm.  It does not require a foundation slab and can be anchored to the ground with iron stakes. Numerous examples were manufactured for military use in World War 2 and various different sizes were available. Many found post-war use as agricultural or industrial buildings and some still remain in use on airfields such as Fairoaks, Redhill, Coal Aston and White Waltham today. Denham Aerodrome still uses their blister hangar to house the only fixed wing flying school on the field, The Pilot Centre.

References
English Heritage Dictionary definition

Aircraft hangars
Portable buildings and shelters